Sociedad Deportiva Erandio Club is a football club from the Basque Country, from the city of Erandio in Biscay (Spain). The club was officially founded in 1915 and they currently play in the Honor Division, though have played twice in the Spanish second division.

Erandio Club are well known as a traditional club, both within and outside of Biscay. The white and blue club is one of the few in the province whose name has appeared in the select list of champions in the Spanish state, despite their best times being back in the 1930s, 1940s and early 1950s. However, they have always been within the parameters of a very modest club. One of the key characteristics of Erandio is that all of their teams have been formed by amateur players.

The club's record is excellent, and the list of players who went on to play in the First Division reinforce this. Juanín, Ipiña, Pitxi Garizurieta, Arqueta, Zarra, Venancio, José Luis Garay, José Luis Bilbao Bala Negra (Black Bullet), Higinio Ortúzar, Alejandro Bilbao and Sertutxa played for the team at various times. Other players such as Juan Ramón and Basauri (Valencia), Terín Álvarez (Racing de Santander), Lorenzo Fernández Learra Lorín (Racing, Zaragoza, Montpellier and Nîmes from the 1st French division, then trained and played in the Bañols of the 3rd division), J.L. Perez Tokilla (Oviedo and Deportivo), Pedro María Herrera (Salamanca, Celta and Zaragoza), Toni Gorriaran (Oviedo and Alavés) and Savin Bilbao (Deportivo de la Coruña) were also invaluable to Erandio's contribution to the football elite

History 
Erandio club was incorporated in early 1915, though the team had been playing informally since around 1913. It played in the North Regional League, in the Second Division, until 1918. In 1916 the club acquired its own land for its pitch and opened Ategorri field in 1918.

Between 1922 and 1927, the club had a difficult time and descended to Segunda División B, but in the early 1930s it performed well in the amateur leagues, claiming regional championships and performing well nationally. After the civil war, Spanish football and the club saw restructuring and reformation. In this period, Telmo Zarraonandia played for them. The club won championships regularly in the early forties, and by 1949 it reached the Spanish Second Division. At the end of the 1949-1950 season, however, the club descended from the Second Division and also lost their field. Erandio played in borrowed fields until it opened New Ategorri field on 13 October 1967.

For most of the seventies, Erandio played in the Regional Preferente. In the 1980-1981 season, the Eerandio reached the highest point of its history achieving the ascension to Segunda B. The seventh place achieved during their 1981-1982 debut marked their best classification in the new category. The team, however, was unable to maintain its performance and was relegated to Third Division in 1984-1985. Since 1985, the club has stayed low, remaining in the Third Division (1985-1988/1992-1994), the División de Honor (1988-1992/1994-), and the Preferente Territorial from 2007 to 2011.

In October 2010, an assembly approved the municipalization of all of the Club's properties, notably the historic Ategorri Soccer Field.  The team was unable to afford the maintenance of the field due to low attendance.

On 14 May 2011, the Erandio achieved to return to the División de Honor after four seasons by winning 4-1 to Padura.

After three seasons in the División de Honor, Erandio during the 2013-2014 season finished in second position and promoting against Tolosa and San Inazio (Álava) winning said promotion and occupying the vacancy of the Laudio, which descended due to being unable to pay dues to the federation.

Erandio, after twenty years, in the 2014-2015 season competed in its centenary in the Group IV of the Tercera División. In that same season after a bad run of results, Erandio Club descended to the División de Honor. At the end of the season, a game of veterans was played commemorative of the club centenary against a veteran team of the Athletic Club. Among which was players like Imanol, Armando, Lakabeg, Casas, Ocio, J. Etxeberria, J. González y Gabilondo. On 27 August 2015, the club published a book with the history of 100 years of the club. On 7 December 2015, the tv show "El día después" of Canal+ rebroadcast a report of the centenary of the club.

In 2017, the club received recognition from the Basque Government for its value to the Basque community.

Symbology

Shield 
In the shield of Erandio Club the top-left margin contains one sphere and in the top-right vertical blue bars and the cross of St. Andrew. The rest of the shield is covered by blue vertical bars tilted to the right, and the center contains the initials E and C from Erandio Club.

Mascot 
The Erandio Club mascot is Kai, which comes from Basque kaio which means "seagull". Their appearance is of a seagull wearing a beret and wears the main shirt of Erandio Club.

Uniform 
The first kit consists of a blue-striped shirt, blue shorts and blue socks with white trim.

As for the away kit has traditionally consisted of a red shirt with blue and white trim with blue shorts and blue socks stockings with white trim.
Currently, they wear a red shirt with white piping on the shoulders and neck with red pants and stockings of the same color

Anthem 
¡Aupa Erandio!, Composed in 1965 on the occasion of the Golden Jubilee of the Society Foundations, Pablo Martinez Ibarruri composed the lyrics of the anthem dedicated to the Club. the musical composition was the work of master Rodrigo A. Santiago. The chorus Otxote Txipli Txapla recorded for the first time the anthem on CD.

Organization 2015/19

Board of Directors

Honours 

 Amateur Championship Spain (1): 1933
 Runner Amateur Championship Spain (1): 1932
 Championship Biscayne Amateur (14): 1931, 32, 33, 34, 35, 42, 44, 73, 74, 75, 76, 77, 78 and 79. It is the club that has won more times this title.

Other Honours 

 Ategorri Trophy Champion (14): 1981, 1983, 1986, 1989, 1998, 1999, 2001, 2003, 2004, 2006, 2010, 2012, 2015, 2016
 Ategorri Trophy Runner (16): 1971, 1975, 1978, 1980, 1988, 1990, 1991, 1992, 1993, 1995, 2000, 2002, 2005, 2007, 2008, 2011 (Ategorri Trophy registry is since 1970) 
 Christmas Trophy Champion (4): 2003, 2009, 2010, 2012 (Christmas Trophy registry is since 2002)

Historical Evolution in the League

Evolution Chart 
From 1915 to 1965:

* Note 1: Between 1928 and 1929 the categories of First, Second and Third Division were introduced. Until then there was only regional categories that organized the Royal Spanish Football Federation and Biscayne Football Federation (both founded in 1913)
* Note 2: Between 1936 and 1939 there was no league for the Spanish civil war.

From 1965 to 2015:
* Note: Second B was introduced in 1977 as an intermediate category between the Second and Third Division.

From 1015 to present:

Season 2016/17 

 (inj) = Injured long-term
 (c) = Captain

Youth Teams

Erandio "B" 
The Erandio "B" is the subsidiary of Erandio Club team. Currently on Vizcaya First Territorial Division, group 1 and play their games in Ategorri.

Youth 
The club has two youth teams federated, each in a different category.
The First Youth (Txorierri) currently plays in the Youth First Division of Group 1 and the second juvenile (Ategorri) plays in Youth Second Division Group 4.

Cadets and Infant  
The club also has available cadet teams and children to promote new players.
The junior team currently plays in the second division of cadets of Group 4 and infant child in the second division.

Neskak  
Erandio has a women's team from 2002-2007 until the first team won promotion to Regional 1st Biscayne in 2006/07. In 2007 after splitting with Erandio Sport Society Club and born Betiko Neskak Futbol Kirol Elkartea

References

External links

SD Erandio Club Official Website
Prices and subscriptions of club
Vizcaya Federation of Football

Football clubs in the Basque Country (autonomous community)
Association football clubs established in 1915
Divisiones Regionales de Fútbol clubs
1915 establishments in Spain
Segunda División clubs
Sport in Biscay